The 2012 Syed Modi International India Grand Prix Gold was the last Grand Prix Gold and Grand Prix tournament of the 2012 BWF Grand Prix Gold and Grand Prix. The tournament was held in Babu Banarasi Das Indoor Stadium, Lucknow, India from 18 December until 23 December 2012 and had a total purse of $120,000.

Men's singles

Seeds

  Taufik Hidayat (first round)
  Kashyap Parupalli (champion)
  Tommy Sugiarto (semi-final)
  Ajay Jayaram (third round)
  Alamsyah Yunus (semi-final)
  Sourabh Varma (first round)
  Mohd Arif Abdul Latif (third round)
  Niluka Karunaratne (second round)
  Muhammad Hafiz Hashim (withdrew)
  Suppanyu Avihingsanon (second round)
  Andre Kurniawan Tedjono (withdrew)
  R. M. V. Gurusaidutt (quarter-final)
  Derek Wong (first round)
  Tanongsak Saensomboonsuk (final)
  Zulfadli Zulkiffli (first round)
  B. Sai Praneeth (third round)

Finals

Top half

Section 1

Section 2

Section 3

Section 4

Bottom half

Section 5

Section 6

Section 7

Section 8

Women's singles

Seeds

  Saina Nehwal (first round)
  P. V. Sindhu (final)
  Sapsiree Taerattanachai (semi-final)
  Nichaon Jindapon (quarter-final)
  Aprilia Yuswandari (quarter-final)
  Nozomi Okuhara (semi-final)
  Lindaweni Fanetri (champion)
  Hera Desi (second round)

Finals

Top half

Section 1

Section 2

Bottom half

Section 3

Section 4

Men's doubles

Seeds

  Yonathan Suryatama Dasuki/Hendra Aprida Gunawan (semi-final)
  Ricky Karanda Suwardi/Muhammad Ulinnuha (quarter-final)
  Patiphat Chalardchaleam/Nipitphon Phuangphuapet (first round)
  Ko Sung-hyun/Lee Yong-dae (champion)
  Marcus Fernaldi Gideon/Agripina Prima Rahmanto Putra (semi-final)
  Andrei Adistia/Christopher Rusdianto (quarter-final)
  Tarun Kona/Arun Vishnu (first round)
  Pranav Chopra/Akshay Dewalkar (second round)

Finals

Top half

Section 1

Section 2

Bottom half

Section 3

Section 4

Women's doubles

Seeds

  Shinta Mulia Sari/Yao Lei (semi-final)
  Savitree Amitrapai/Sapsiree Taerattanachai (champion)
  Komala Dewi/Jenna Gozali (final)
  Lee So-hee/Shin Seung-chan (semi-final)

Finals

Top half

Section 1

Section 2

Bottom half

Section 3

Section 4

Mixed doubles

Seeds

  Muhammad Rijal/Debby Susanto (withdrew)
  Fran Kurniawan/Shendy Puspa Irawati (champion)
  Danny Bawa Chrisnanta/Vanessa Neo (semi-final)
  Riky Widianto/Richi Puspita Dili (withdrew)

Finals

Top half

Section 1

Section 2

Bottom half

Section 3

Section 4

References

Syed Modi International Badminton Championships
India
India Open Grand Prix Gold
Sport in Lucknow
December 2012 sports events in India